Sarah Ewens (born 19 April 1992) is a Scottish professional footballer who plays as a forward for London City Lionesses of the FA Women's Championship.

Club career

Ewens joined Celtic from Hibernian in December 2016. She scored 64 goals in 98 appearances for Celtic, across the next four seasons, before joining Birmingham City for an undisclosed transfer fee in July 2021.

References

External links
 
 

1992 births
Living people
Scottish women's footballers
Scottish Women's Premier League players
Hibernian W.F.C. players
Celtic F.C. Women players
Women's Super League players
Women's association football forwards
Footballers from Edinburgh
Birmingham City W.F.C. players
Spartans W.F.C. players